"Praise Song for the Day" is an occasional poem written by the American poet Elizabeth Alexander and delivered at the 2009 presidential inauguration of President Barack Obama. The poem is the fourth to be delivered at a United States presidential inauguration, following in the tradition of recitals by Robert Frost (John F. Kennedy, 1961), Maya Angelou (Bill Clinton, 1993), and Miller Williams (Bill Clinton, 1997).

It consists of fourteen unrhymed three-line stanzas (tercets) and a one-line coda.  Delivered directly after Obama's inaugural address, it received a lukewarm response and was criticized as "too prosaic." Graywolf Press published the poem in paperback 6 February 2009, with a first printing of 100,000 copies.

Adam Kirsch called the poem "bureaucratic verse."

See also
Poems at United States presidential inaugurations

References

External links 
Text of the poem
Video of the poem's recitation

American poems
Inaugural poems
2009 poems
African-American poetry
First inauguration of Barack Obama
Occasional poetry